The men's doubles tournament at the US Open was held from August 27 to September 8, 1985, on the outdoor hard courts at the USTA National Tennis Center in New York City, United States. Ken Flach and Robert Seguso won the title, defeating Henri Leconte and Yannick Noah in the final.

Seeds

Draw

Finals

Top half

Section 1

Section 2

Bottom half

Section 3

Section 4

External links
 Main draw
1985 US Open – Men's draws and results at the International Tennis Federation

Men's Doubles
US Open (tennis) by year – Men's doubles